is a Japanese reading of a Sino-Japanese character, which is often used to refer to what is claimed to be a specific Japanese concept of negative space. In modern interpretations of traditional Japanese arts and culture,  is taken to refer to an artistic interpretation of an empty space, often holding as much importance as the rest of an artwork and focusing the viewer on the intention of negative space in an art piece. The concept of space as a positive entity is opposed to the absence of such a principle in a correlated 'Japanese' notion of space. Though commonly used to refer to literal, visible negative space,  may also refer to the perception of a space, gap or interval, without necessarily requiring a physical compositional element. This results in the concept of  being less reliant on the existence of a gap, and more closely related to the perception of a gap.

Etymology

Originally, the character  was written with the radical for "moon" instead of the character for "sun", and, in this form, depicted, according to Bernhard Karlgren, "A door through the crevice of which the moonshine peeps in".

The character can be read differently when emphasis is put on the connection between things, the distance between things, or the distance between people.

Usage in Japan
 appears in many areas of Japanese arts and culture. For example, the  alcove in a traditional Japanese room is a space or a stage used to display important objects, such as a painting scroll, an important art object, or a flower arrangement.

In , the space around the flowers is considered to be equally as important as the flowers and plants themselves, with harmony and balance between the two considered the ideal.

In karate,  refers to the distance between two fighters. Knowing the safe distance between oneself and an opponent based on their reach is considered "understanding ".

Usage in the West
In his 2001 book, The Art of Looking Sideways, graphic designer Alan Fletcher discussed the importance that perceived negative space could hold in art:

Author Derrick de Kerckhove described  as "the complex network of relationships between people and objects".

See also

, a term in Chinese philosophy
Negative space
Yin and yang
Liminality
The Void (philosophy)

References

External links
"Negative Space" - discussing photographic techniques

Japanese words and phrases
Zen
Composition in visual art
Japanese aesthetics